The 2020–21 DFB-Pokal was the 78th season of the annual German football cup competition. Sixty-four teams participated in the competition, including all teams from the previous year's Bundesliga and 2. Bundesliga. The competition began on 11 September 2020 with the first of six rounds and ended on 13 May 2021 with the final at the Olympiastadion in Berlin, a nominally neutral venue, which has hosted the final since 1985. The competition was originally scheduled to begin on 14 August 2020 and conclude on 22 May 2021, though this was delayed due to postponement of the previous season as a result of the COVID-19 pandemic. The DFB-Pokal is considered the second-most important club title in German football after the Bundesliga championship. The DFB-Pokal is run by the German Football Association (DFB).

Bundesliga side Bayern Munich were the two-time defending champions, having defeated Bayer Leverkusen 4–2 in the previous final to clinch a record 20th title. However, Bayern were knocked out of the competition in the second round by second-division side Holstein Kiel, losing on penalties following a 2–2 draw after extra time.

Borussia Dortmund won the final 4–1 against RB Leipzig for their fifth title. As winners, Dortmund will feature in the 2021 edition of the DFL-Supercup at the start of the next season, and will face the champion of the 2020–21 Bundesliga, Bayern Munich. The winner of the DFB-Pokal also earns automatic qualification for the group stage of the 2021–22 edition of the UEFA Europa League. However, as Dortmund already qualified for the 2021–22 edition of the UEFA Champions League through their position in the Bundesliga, the spot will go to the team in sixth, and the league's UEFA Europa Conference League play-off round spot will go to the team in seventh.

Effects of the COVID-19 pandemic
On 31 August 2020, the DFB Executive Committee decided to extend the use of five substitutions in matches to the 2020–21 season, which was implemented at the end of the previous season to lessen the impact of fixture congestion caused by the COVID-19 pandemic. The use of five substitutes, based on the decision of competition organisers, had been extended by IFAB until 2021. Due to the impact of the COVID-19 pandemic in Germany and the high economic and organisational effort required to host the fixture, including loss of ticket revenue for matches behind closed doors, many amateur teams in the competition decided to waive their home rights and exchange the duty of hosting the match with their opponents. The DFB in general will allow spectators if approved by the local health department, though away supporters are not permitted at the start of the competition.

Participating clubs
The following 64 teams qualified for the competition:

Format

Participation
The DFB-Pokal begins with a round of 64 teams. The 36 teams of the Bundesliga and 2. Bundesliga, along with the top 4 finishers of the 3. Liga are automatically qualified for the tournament. Of the remaining slots, 21 are given to the cup winners of the regional football associations, the Verbandspokal. The 3 remaining slots are given to the three regional associations with the most men's teams, which currently is Bavaria, Lower Saxony, and Westphalia. The best-placed amateur team of the Regionalliga Bayern is given the Spot for Bavaria. For Lower Saxony, the Lower Saxony Cup is split into two paths: one for 3. Liga and Regionalliga Nord teams, and the other for amateur teams. The winners of each path qualify. For Westphalia, the winner of a play-off between the best-placed team of the Regionalliga West and Oberliga Westfalen also qualify. As every team is entitled to participate in local tournaments which qualify for the association cups, every team can in principle compete in the DFB-Pokal. Reserve teams and combined football sections are not permitted to enter, along with no two teams of the same association or corporation.

Draw
The draws for the different rounds are conducted as following:

For the first round, the participating teams will be split into two pots of 32 teams each. The first pot contains all teams which have qualified through their regional cup competitions, the best four teams of the 3. Liga, and the bottom four teams of the 2. Bundesliga. Every team from this pot will be drawn to a team from the second pot, which contains all remaining professional teams (all the teams of the Bundesliga and the remaining fourteen 2. Bundesliga teams). The teams from the first pot will be set as the home team in the process.

The two-pot scenario will also be applied for the second round, with the remaining 3. Liga and/or amateur team(s) in the first pot and the remaining Bundesliga and 2. Bundesliga teams in the other pot. Once again, the 3. Liga and/or amateur team(s) will serve as hosts. This time the pots do not have to be of equal size though, depending on the results of the first round. Theoretically, it is even possible that there may be only one pot, if all of the teams from one of the pots from the first round beat all the others in the second pot. Once one pot is empty, the remaining pairings will be drawn from the other pot with the first-drawn team for a match serving as hosts.

For the remaining rounds, the draw will be conducted from just one pot. Any remaining 3. Liga and/or amateur team(s) will be the home team if drawn against a professional team. In every other case, the first-drawn team will serve as hosts.

Match rules
Teams meet in one game per round. Matches take place for 90 minutes, with two halves of 45 minutes. If still tied after regulation, 30 minutes of extra time will be played, consisting of two periods of 15 minutes. If the score is still level after this, the match will be decided by a penalty shoot-out. A coin toss will decide who takes the first penalty. A maximum of nine players can be listed on the substitute bench, while a maximum of five substitutions are allowed. However, each team is only given three opportunities to make substitutions, with a fourth opportunity in extra time, excluding substitutions made at half-time, before the start of extra time and at half-time in extra time. From the round of 16 onward, a video assistant referee will be appointed for all DFB-Pokal matches. Though technically possible, VAR will not be used for home matches of Bundesliga clubs prior to the round of 16 in order to provide a uniform approach to all matches.

Suspensions
If a player receives five yellow cards in the competition, he will then be suspended from the next cup match. Similarly, receiving a second yellow card suspends a player from the next cup match. If a player receives a direct red card, they will be suspended a minimum of one match, but the German Football Association reserves the right to increase the suspension.

Champion qualification
The winner of the DFB-Pokal earns automatic qualification for the group stage of next year's edition of the UEFA Europa League. If they have already qualified for the UEFA Champions League through position in the Bundesliga, then the spot will go to the team in sixth, and the league's second qualifying round spot will go to the team in seventh. The winner also will host the DFL-Supercup at the start of the next season, and will face the champion of the previous year's Bundesliga, unless the same team wins the Bundesliga and the DFB-Pokal, completing a double. In that case, the runner-up of the Bundesliga will take the spot and host instead.

Schedule

All draws were generally be held at the German Football Museum in Dortmund, on a Sunday evening at 18:00 after each round (unless noted otherwise). The draws were televised on ARD's Sportschau, broadcast on Das Erste.

The rounds of the 2020–21 competition were scheduled as follows:

Matches
A total of sixty-three matches took place, starting with the first round on 14 August 2020 and culminating with the final on 22 May 2021 at the Olympiastadion in Berlin.

Times up to 25 October 2020 and from 28 March 2021 are CEST (UTC+2). Times from 26 October 2020 to 27 March 2021 are CET (UTC+1).

First round
The draw for the first round was held on 26 July 2020 at 18:30, with Heike Ullrich drawing the matches. As the winners of the Verbandspokal were not yet known, placeholders were used in the draw. Since SV Rödinghausen could still qualify as both the Westphalian Cup winner and the play-off winner at the time of the draw, the assignment of the two Westphalian teams required an additional draw after both competitions were completed. The second draw, which included RSV Meinerzhagen and SC Wiedenbrück, took place at the DFB headquarters in Frankfurt on 26 August 2020, 10:45, with Renate Lingor drawing the matches. The thirty-two matches took place from 11 to 14 September, 15 October and 3 November 2020.

Second round
The draw for the second round was held on 8 November 2020 at 18:30, with Inka Grings drawing the matches. It was originally scheduled for 18 October 2020 at 18:00, but was delayed due to the postponement of one first round match to November 2020. The sixteen matches took place from 22 to 23 December 2020 and from 12 to 13 January 2021.

Round of 16
The draw for the round of 16 was held on 3 January 2021 at 17:30, with Sven Hannawald drawing the matches. The eight matches took place from 2 to 3 February 2021.

Quarter-finals
The draw for the quarter-finals was held on 7 February 2021 at 18:30, with Boris Herrmann drawing the matches. The four matches took place from 2 to 3 March and 7 April 2021.

Semi-finals
The draw for the semi-finals was held on 7 March 2021 at 18:30, with Bärbel Wohlleben drawing the matches. The two matches took place on 30 April and 1 May 2021.

Final

The final took place on 13 May 2021 at the Olympiastadion in Berlin.

Top goalscorers
The following were the top scorers of the DFB-Pokal, sorted first by number of goals, and then alphabetically if necessary. Goals scored in penalty shoot-outs are not included.

Notes

References

External links
 
DFB-Pokal on kicker.de 

2020-21
2020–21 in German football cups